Peter Svensson (born December 28, 1983) is a Danish handballer, currently playing for Danish Handball League side GOG Svendborg, with whom he won the Danish Championship in 2007.

External links
 player info

1983 births
Living people
Danish male handball players